Stalk of the Celery Monster is a 1979 short animated film written, directed and animated entirely in pencil by Tim Burton during his time as a student with the California Institute of the Arts. The film caused such a stir among his class that it attracted the attention of the Walt Disney Animation Studios, who offered young Burton an animator's apprenticeship at their studio.

Plot 
A mad scientist and his assistant are working but he is really a dentist.

Preservation status
It was shot on 8 mm film and for much time it was considered to be lost, until fragments of it were shown in 2006 on Spanish television. Currently, the excerpts of the film are archived at the Library of Congress''.

See also
List of incomplete or partially lost films

References

External links
 
 

1979 films
Animated films directed by Tim Burton
Short films directed by Tim Burton
1979 animated films
American animated short films
1970s American animated films
1970s English-language films